"Tout l'univers" is a song by Swiss singer Gjon's Tears released as a single on 10 March 2021 by Jo & Co and Sony Music. It was written and composed by the singer himself alongside Nina Sampermans, Wouter Hardy and Xavier Michel. The song represented Switzerland in the Eurovision Song Contest 2021 in Rotterdam, the Netherlands, after being internally selected by the Swiss Broadcasting Corporation (SRG SSR). The song finished in 3rd place, receiving 432 points, the best result of Switzerland in the 21st century and its best result since 1993.  It also won the Composer Award in the 2021 edition of the Marcel Bezençon Awards, voted on by a panel of participating composers in the 2021 contest.

Release and promotion 

"Tout l'univers" was made available for digital download and streaming by Jo & Co and Sony Music on 10 March 2021. The accompanying music video premiered on the official YouTube channel of the Eurovision Song Contest simultaneously with the digital release on 10 March 2021 at 16:00 (CET).

At Eurovision

Internal selection 

On 20 March 2020, SRG SSR confirmed that Gjon's Tears would represent Switzerland in the 2021 contest.

Rotterdam 

The 65th edition of the Eurovision Song Contest took place in Rotterdam, the Netherlands and consisted of two semi-finals on 18 May and 20 May 2021, and the grand final on 22 May 2021. On 17 November 2020, it was announced that Switzerland would be performing in the second half of the second semi-final of the contest.

At The 2022 Winter Olympics 

The track was used by a figure skater Morisi Kvitelashvili in his short program for 2021–2022 season, which was also presented at 2022 Winter Olympics

Track listing

Charts

Release history

External links
 Tout l'univers (lyrics and translation)

References 

2021 songs
2021 singles
French-language songs
Eurovision songs of 2021
Eurovision songs of Switzerland
Gjon's Tears songs
Number-one singles in Switzerland
Sony Music singles
Songs written by Wouter Hardy